The Venezuelan tyrannulet (Zimmerius petersi) is a species of passerine bird in the family Tyrannidae. It is found in northern Venezuela.

The  Venezuelan tyrannulet was formerly considered to be conspecific with Zimmerius improbus (now spectacled tyrannulet) but the two species were split after a molecular phylogenetic study published in 2013 found that they were not closely related.

References

Venezuelan tyrannulet
Birds of the Venezuelan Coastal Range
Venezuelan tyrannulet
Taxonomy articles created by Polbot